Our Lady of Częstochowa-St Casimir Parish is a church in New York City at 24th Street in Brooklyn. The church, which was designated for Polish immigrants, was founded in 1896. It could also be spelled Częnstochowa, due to the tail on the third letter. The original church building was a wood-frame structure, which was destroyed by a fire in 1904. The replacement was a Gothic Revival Style with a tower and steeple rising to 175 feet that was built on the site of the original church.

This is one of the Polish-American Roman Catholic parishes in New York City in the Diocese of Brooklyn.

History 
Among the immigrants of many ethnic groups, who come to the United States at the end of the nineteenth century, there was a significant number of Poles, who for various reasons left their homeland. Relatively many of them settled in Brooklyn, especially in the southern part of the town of Gowanus, Brooklyn.
In 1904, Bishop McDonnell of Brooklyn installed the current cornerstone for a Gothic church of brick and Belleville gray stone. The front facade on 24th street had a central tower which rose to a height of 176feet above the sidewalk, flanked by shorter steeples on both sides. The project when completed in 1911 included a school and rectory.

The parochial school was the province of the Sisters of the Holy Family of Nazareth order of nuns, founded in Rome, Italy in 1875 by Frances Siedliska, a Polish noblewoman; it closed in 1996. As of 2015, there are over 1,300 members of the order in Australia, Belarus, England, France, Israel, Italy, Lithuania, the Philippines, Poland, Puerto Rico, Russia, Spain, Ukraine, and the United States of America.

That building period was at the occurrence of a schism in the Roman Catholic church, with reformist Lithuanian and Polish congregants bemoaning the lack of Polish speaking priests in the clergy. The reform movement among European immigrants began in the 1870s, immigrants wanted to establish their own parishes where priests would speak their language, but received little support from American bishops who were mainly of Irish and German descent. In 1884, a meeting of American bishops in Baltimore decided that property of parishes belonged not to the community that financed it but to the diocese. Lawsuits between pastors and parishioners over the property were quite common. In protest of such policies, the Polish National Catholic Church (PNCC) was established in 1897.

In the meantime, a number of parish-related organizations were formed such as:

 Polish National Alliance (pol. Związek Narodowy Polski w USA),
 Polish Women's Alliance of American - PWAA (pol. Związek Polek W Ameryce),
 Polish Roman Catholic Union of America (pol. Zjednoczenie Polskie Rzymsko-Katolickie),
 Polish Falcons (pol. Polskie Towarzystwo Gimnastyczne "Sokół"'),
 (pol.) Macierz Polska,
 (pol.) Towarzystwo Bratniej Pomocy Studentów (pot. Bratniak,
 St. Anne's Society (pol. Towarzystwo św. Anny),
 Polish American Citizen Club (pol. Polsko-Amerykański Klub Obywatelski),
 Polish Army Veterans Association in America (pol. Stowarzyszenie Weteranów Armii Polskiej w Ameryce (SWAP)''),
 (pol.) Koło Dramatu i Śpiewu

The architect for the 1904 building was T. Edwards of Dorchester, MA.

Between 1906 and 1908, three Felician nuns from Buffalo were brought in to teach in the basement of the church. In 1911 a school was completed including a hall in the basement for parish functions.  By 1926 school enrollment increased from an initial 103 students to 642.  Eight nuns and two lay teachers were hired with approximately 60 students per class.

In 1919, a two-manual organ was installed by the Tellers-Kent Organ Company at St. Casimir. It was a divided organ, placed in the gallery facing the nave, with a detached key console. After the merger in 1980, the organ was relocated to Our Lady of Czestochowa.

After Fr. Chmielinski's death in 1937, Rev Bartula is appointed pastor followed by Rev. Naguszewski.  In 1940 Cardinal William O'Connell entrusts the parish to the Franciscan fathers.  Fr. Michael Cieslik. O.F.M. is the first Franciscan pastor and serves until 1942.  In 1942, Fr. Stephen Musielak, O.F.M. is appointed pastor and serves as pastor until 1957.  During that time, a club for teenagers and young adults was organized using the lower church hall for a meeting place. Fr. Musielak played a leading role in the settling of the post World War II wave of new Polish immigrants helping them locate family and friends in the US and finding lodging, securing employment, establishing residence and obtaining medical care.  From 1943 to 1951 post WWII immigrants and non-Polish families from Old Colony Housing Project create mixed school enrollment.  Classes are divided into two separate groups—1. exclusively in English and 2. Polish language as well as English.

In 1957, Fr. Angelus Zator is named pastor and services until 1966. In 1961 the church celebrates its 75th Diamond Jubilee with a concelebrated Mass.

In 1966, Rev. Edwin Agonis, OFM becomes pastor.

In 1973, Rev Manual Wolkanowski OFM is appointed pastor through 1979. In 1978 Karol Jozef Wojtyla is elected Pope and takes the name, John Paul II.

In 1980, St. Casimir's Roman Catholic Church, a polish church in Williamsburg was closed and the congregants joined with Our Lady of Częstochowa, at which time the church assumed the new name of Our Lady of Częstochowa-St. Casimir Church. In 1996, the church celebrates its 100th Anniversary.

Black Madonna of Częstochowa

Lucan tradition
The icon of Our Lady of Częstochowa has been intimately associated with Poland for the past 600 years. Its history before it arrived in Poland is shrouded in numerous legends that trace the icon's origin to St. Luke, who painted it on a cedar table top from the Holy Family house. The same legend holds that the painting was discovered in Jerusalem in 326 by St. Helena, who brought it back to Constantinople and presented it to her son, Constantine the Great.

Pastors 
Please note, this is a list of pastors of the OLC parish in South Boston MA, not the NYC parish. I was a parishioner at OLC south Boston, so I have no information on the NYC parish.

 Fr. Jan M. Chmieliński (1893–1934)
 Fr. Peter Bartula (1935–1938),
 Fr. Edward B. Naguszewski (1936–1940).

In 1940 Cardinal William Henry O'Connell entrusted the parish to the care of the Conventual Franciscans Fathers:
 Fr. Michael Cieślik OFM Conv (1940–1942)
 Fr. Stephen Musielak OFM Conv (1942–1957)
 Fr. Angelus Zator OFM Conv (1957–1966)
 Fr. Alfred Stopyra OFM Conv (1966–1967)
 Fr. Edwin Agonis OFM Conv (1967–1973)
 Fr. Manual Wolkanowski OFM Conv (1973–1979)
 Fr. John Bambol OFM Conv (1979–1985)
 Fr. Andrew Skiba OFM Conv (1985–1991)
 Fr. Paul Miśkiewicz OFM Conv (1991–1994)

In 1994 the parish was taken over by Conventual Franciscans from Polish Prowincja Matki Bożej Niepokalanej in Warszawa, Poland:
 Fr. Andrzej Sujka OFM Conv (1994–2000)
 Fr. Miroslaw Podymniak OFM Conv (2001–2006)
 Fr. Jerzy Auguścik OFM Conv (2006–2008)
 Fr. Andrzej Urbaniak OFM Conv (2008 - suspended in 2012)
 Fr. Jan Łempicki OFM Conv (2013–2015)
 Fr. Jerzy Żebrowski OFM Conv (2015–)

See also

Polish Cathedral style churches of Chicago
Polish Americans
Roman Catholicism in Poland
Poles in Chicago
List of churches in the Roman Catholic Diocese of Brooklyn

References

Bibliography 
 
 

 The Official Catholic Directory in USA

External links 

 Official Site
 Our Lady Of Czestochowa - Diocesan information
 Our Lady Of Czestochowa - ParishesOnline.com
 Roman Catholic Diocese of Brooklyn
 Sisters of the Holy Family of Nazareth
 Parish bulletins 

1896 establishments in New York City
Polish-American Roman Catholic parishes in the United States
Roman Catholic Diocese of Brooklyn
Churches in the United States
Roman Catholic churches in Brooklyn
Roman Catholic churches completed in 1904
20th-century Roman Catholic church buildings in the United States
Gothic Revival church buildings in New York City